Marcel Stern (9 January 1922 – 16 April 2002) was a Swiss competitive sailor and Olympic medalist. He won a silver medal in the 5.5 Metre class at the 1968 Summer Olympics in Mexico City, together with Bernard Dunand and Louis Noverraz.

References

1922 births
2002 deaths
Swiss male sailors (sport)
Sailors at the 1948 Summer Olympics – 6 Metre
Sailors at the 1952 Summer Olympics – 6 Metre
Sailors at the 1968 Summer Olympics – 5.5 Metre
Olympic sailors of Switzerland
Olympic silver medalists for Switzerland
Olympic medalists in sailing
Medalists at the 1968 Summer Olympics
20th-century Swiss people